Dance is the seventh studio album by Keller Williams, released in 2003.  It contains remixes of songs from his preceding album, Laugh.

Track listing
 Tweeker 4:41  
 Bazooka Speaker Funk 4:02  
 Chunter 4:32  
 Yeah 4:34  
 Room to Grow 3:44  
 Mental Floss  3:59  
 Better Than Reality 4:12  
 Barker 5:02  
 Flabbergasting 3:07  
 Chickahominy Fred 4:37  
 Worth All the Dough 4:30  
 Butt Sweat 4:40

Credits
Mark Berger - Design, Layout Design, Package Concept  
Jeff Covert - Engineer, Mixing  
C. Taylor Crothers - Photography  
Charlie Pilzer - Mastering  
Jim Robeson - Mixing  
Keller Williams - Producer

References

2003 albums
Keller Williams albums